Mamata Medical College is a private medical college with a teaching hospital, Mamata General Hospital in the heart of Khammam, Telangana. It is affiliated to Kaloji Narayana Rao University of Health Sciences, Telangana.

Location
It's located in Rotary Nagar area of Khammam town of Khammam District .

Departments
General Medicine
Paediatrics
Radio-Diagnosis
TB & Chest 
Skin & VD
Psychiatry
General Surgery
Orthopaedics 
Ophthalmology
ENT 
Obstetrics & Gynaecology

See also 
Education in India
Literacy in India
List of institutions of higher education in Telangana

References

External links
 Mamata Medical College website

Medical colleges in Telangana
Hospitals in Telangana
Khammam
1992 establishments in Andhra Pradesh
Educational institutions established in 1992
Education in Khammam district